Oedura is a  genus of medium to large geckos, lizards in the family  Diplodactylidae. The genus is endemic to Australia. Species in the genus are referred to by the common name velvet geckos.

Geographic range
Most of the species of Oedura occur in northern and eastern Australia, with further isolates in the arid zone (Pilbara, Central Ranges and Flinders Ranges).

Behaviour and habitat
Geckos of the genus Oedura are mostly arboreal and nocturnal, and have flattened bodies that are distinctly patterned. They are secretive tree or rock dwellers, usually concealing themselves beneath peeling bark or in cracks and crevices. A species found in the Kimberley region, Oedura filicipoda, is named for the plumose fringing on the toes that may assist in clinging to rocky overhangs.  All species are adapted to their dry conditions and can go for months without food or water.

Taxonomy
The content of the genus Oedura has been reduced by Oliver et al. in 2012, when they transferred four species to the genus Amalosia and erected two new monotypic genera, Hesperoedura for Oedura reticulata and Nebulifera for Oedura robusta.

Species
The type species for the genus is Oedura marmorata, first described by John Edward Gray in 1842. The following is a list of the 19 valid species:
Oedura argentea 
Oedura bella 
Oedura castelnaui  – northern velvet gecko
Oedura cincta 
Oedura coggeri  – northern spotted velvet gecko
Oedura elegans  – elegant velvet gecko
Oedura filicipoda  – fringe-toed velvet gecko
Oedura fimbria 
Oedura gemmata  – jewelled velvet gecko
Oedura gracilis  – gracile velvet gecko
Oedura jowalbinna 
Oedura lineata  – Arcadia velvet gecko
Oedura luritja 
Oedura marmorata  – marbled velvet gecko
Oedura monilis  – ocellated velvet gecko
Oedura murrumanu  – limestone range velvet gecko
Oedura nesos  
Oedura picta  – ornate velvet gecko
Oedura tryoni  – southern spotted velvet gecko

Nota bene: A binomial authority in parentheses indicates that the species was originally described in a genus other than Oedura.

Species formerly in Oedura

Transferred to genus Amalosia :
Oedura jacovae  – valid as Amalosia jacovae 
Oedura lesueurii – Lesueur's velvet gecko, valid as Amalosia lesueurii 
Oedura obscura – slim velvet gecko, valid as Amalosia obscura 
Oedura rhombifer – zigzag velvet gecko, valid as Amalosia rhombifer 
Transferred to genus Hesperoedura :
Oedura reticulata – reticulated velvet gecko, valid as Hesperoedura reticulata 
Transferred to genus Nebulifera :
Oedura robusta –  robust velvet gecko, valid as Nebulifera robusta

References

Further reading
Cogger HG (2014). Reptiles and Amphibians of Australia, Seventh Edition. Clayton, Victoria, Australia: CSIRO Publishing. xxx + 1,033 pp. .
Wilson, Steve; Swan, Gerry (2013). A Complete Guide to Reptiles of Australia, Fourth Edition. Sydney: New Holland Publishers. 522 pp. .

 
Geckos of Australia
Lizard genera
Taxa named by John Edward Gray